was the lord of south Ise Province, who ruled from Kitabatake Shrine in Mie Prefecture. He learned swordsmanship from Tsukahara Bokuden and so was famous as a skilled swordsman. His territory was invaded by Oda Nobunaga in 1569. He surrendered and adopted Nobunaga’s second son Oda Nobukatsu.

In 1576, Tomonori was killed by Oda Nobunaga's army during the siege of Mie.

References

16th-century Japanese people
Japanese swordfighters
Japanese warriors killed in battle
People of Sengoku-period Japan